Martell (also Martel) is an unincorporated community in southwestern Lancaster County, Nebraska, United States.  It lies along local roads southwest of the city of Lincoln, the county seat of Lancaster County and Nebraska's state capital.  Its elevation is 1,332 feet (406 m).  Although Martell is unincorporated, it has a post office, with the ZIP code of 68404.

Demographics

History
Martell was named after Charles Martel, the 8th-century Duke of the Franks.    The community's name was also spelled Martel until the Board on Geographic Names officially decided in favor of "Martell" in 1896.

References

Unincorporated communities in Lancaster County, Nebraska
Unincorporated communities in Nebraska